The following is a list of events and releases that happened in 2018 in Latin music. The list covers events and releases from Latin regions including Spanish- and Portuguese-speaking areas of Latin America, Spain, Portugal, and the United States.

Events

January–March
January 28 "Despacito" by Luis Fonsi and Daddy Yankee featuring Justin Bieber becomes the first Latin song to receive a diamond certification by the Recording Industry Association of America (RIAA). The RIAA measured data from the original version by Luis Fonsi featuring Daddy Yankee and the remix with Justin Bieber for the award. Luis Fonsi and Daddy Yankee become the 12th and 13th Latin artists to perform at the Grammy Awards.
February 12 "Despacito" by Luis Fonsi, Daddy Yankee, and Justin Bieber breaks the record for the longest-running number-one song on the Billboard Hot Latin Songs chart. The previous record was held by "Bailando" by Enrique Iglesias, Gente de Zona, and Descemer Bueno with 41 weeks.
February 22The 30th Annual Lo Nuestro Awards are held at the American Airlines Arena in Miami, Florida. Nominations are absent due to being a commemorative edition. Special awards are given instead.
Cuban producer Emilio Estefan and Cuban singer Gloria Estefan receive the Lo Nuestro Award to Excellence.
Mexican singer Alejandro Fernández receives the Trajectory Award.
Puerto Rican singer Olga Tañón and Puerto Rican duo Wisin & Yandel receive a special award.
March 6The 26th Annual ASCAP Latin Awards are held at the Marriott Marquis in New York City, New York.
"Despacito" by Luis Fonsi and Daddy Yankee featuring Justin Bieber wins Song of the Year. Only ASCAP members Justin Bieber, Jason "Poo Bear" Boyd, and Daddy Yankee receive the award.
Joss Favela is recognized as Songwriter of the Year.
March 20The 25th Annual BMI Latin Awards are held at the Beverly Wilshire Hotel in Beverly Hills, California.
"Despacito" by Luis Fonsi and Daddy Yankee featuring Justin Bieber wins Contemporary Latin Song of the Year. Only BMI members Luis Fonsi and Marty James receive the award.
J Balvin is recognized as Contemporary Latin Songwriter of the Year.

April–June
April 4The music video of "Despacito" by Luis Fonsi featuring Daddy Yankee becomes the first YouTube video to reach five billion views on the site.
April 10"Despacito" by Luis Fonsi and Daddy Yankee featuring Justin Bieber reaches an unprecedented 50th week at number one on Billboards Hot Latin Songs chart.
April 23The Recording Industry Association of America (RIAA) reports that revenue for the Latin music market in the United States rose 37% in 2017, totaling in $243 million amounting to 2.8 percent of the market in the country. Streaming was noted as the primary factor for the rise in revenue for the Latin music market.
April 24 The International Federation of the Phonographic Industry (IFPI) reports that revenue for the Latin music market in Latin America increased 17.7% in 2017, denoting online streaming as the primary factor for its rise. Physical albums revenue declined 41.5%.
"Despacito" by Luis Fonsi and Daddy Yankee featuring Justin Bieber is the second best-selling digital single of 2017 in the world, with 24.3 million sales plus track-equivalent streams.
April 26The 25th Annual Billboard Latin Music Awards are held at the Mandalay Bay Events Center in Las Vegas, Nevada.
Puerto Rican rapper Daddy Yankee is the biggest winner with eight awards.
Puerto Rican singer Ozuna wins Artist of the Year.
"Despacito" by Luis Fonsi and Daddy Yankee featuring Justin Bieber wins Hot Latin Song of the Year.
Fénix by Nicky Jam wins Top Latin Album of the Year.
April 28Mexican group Calibre 50 and Colombian singer J Balvin receive an award by streaming service Pandora Radio for being the first artists to surpass a billion streams each in that platform.

July–September
July 2Colombian singer J Balvin and Puerto Rican rapper Bad Bunny achieve their first number-one on the Billboard Hot 100 through "I Like It" with American rapper Cardi B. They become the first Latin artists to top the chart since Luis Fonsi and Daddy Yankee in 2017.
July 10Nielsen SoundScan publishes the Latin mid-year chart for the United States and reports that streaming activity has increased in comparison to the first half of 2017, while album and digital single sales decreased.
Odisea by Puerto Rican singer Ozuna is the best-performing album, with 313,000 sales plus track- and stream-equivalent units.
CNCO by CNCO is the best-selling album, with 17,000 copies sold.
"Despacito" by Luis Fonsi and Daddy Yankee featuring Justin Bieber is the best-selling single, with 246,000 downloads sold; the most-streamed song, with 308,980,000 audio and video streams combined; the most-streamed audio, with 119,802,000 streams; and the most-streamed video, with 189,178,000 streams.
July 15  American singer Nicky Jam performs "X" and "Live It Up", the latter together with American rapper Will Smith and Kosovo Albanian singer Era Istrefi, during the FIFA World Cup closing ceremony.

October–December

 November 2 – The 13th LOS40 Music Awards take place at the WiZink Center in Madrid.
 Prometo by Pablo Alborán wins Best Spanish Album.
 "El Patio" by Pablo López wins Best Spanish Song.
 "Déjala Que Baile" by Melendi and Alejandro Sanz wins Best Spanish Video.
 Colombian band Morat wins Best Latin Artist.
 November 4 – The 25th MTV Europe Music Awards take place at the Bizkaia Arena in Bilbao.
 Anitta wins Best Brazilian Act.
 Ha*Ash wins Best Latin America North Act.
 Sebastián Yatra wins Best Latin America Central Act.
 Lali wins Best Latin America South Act.
 Diogo Piçarra wins Best Portuguese Act.
 Viva Suecia wins Best Spanish Act.

November 15The 19th Annual Latin Grammy Awards are held at the MGM Grand Garden Arena in Las Vegas, Nevada:
"Telefonía" by Jorge Drexler wins the Latin Grammy Awards for Record of the Year and Song of the Year.
¡México Por Siempre! by Luis Miguel wins the Album of the Year.
Karol G wins the Latin Grammy Award for Best New Artist
Mexican band Maná is honored Person of the Year, becoming the first musical ensemble to do so.

Number-ones albums and singles by country
List of number-one hits of 2018 (Argentina)
List of number-one songs of 2018 (Bolivia)
List of Hot 100 number-one singles of 2018 (Brazil)
List of number-one songs of 2018 (Colombia)
List of number-one songs of 2018 (Guatemala)
List of number-one albums of 2018 (Mexico)
List of number-one songs of 2018 (Mexico)
List of number-one albums of 2018 (Portugal)
List of number-one albums of 2018 (Spain)
List of number-one singles of 2018 (Spain)
List of number-one Billboard Latin Albums from the 2010s
List of number-one Billboard Hot Latin Songs of 2018
List of number-one Billboard Regional Mexican Songs of 2018
List of number-one songs of 2018 (Venezuela)

Awards
2018 Premio Lo Nuestro
2018 Billboard Latin Music Awards
2018 Latin American Music Awards
2018 Latin Grammy Awards
2018 Heat Latin Music Awards
2018 MTV Millennial Awards

Albums released

First-quarter

January

February

March

Second-quarter

April

May

June

Third-quarter

July

August

September

Fourth-quarter

October

November
{| class="wikitable sortable" style="text-align: left;"
|-
! Day
! Title
! Artist
! Genre(s)
! Singles
! Label
|-
|rowspan="7"| 2
| El mal querer
| Rosalía
| Flamenco nuevo
| "Malamente""Pienso en tu mirá""Di mi nombre"
| Sony Music
|-
| El Hombre
| El Alfa
| Urban
| 
| El Jefe
|-
| Amo
| La Maquinaria Norteña
| Norteño
| 
| Fonovisa
|-
| Mulamba
| Mulamba
| Rock music, MPB
| "P.U.T.A.", "Desses Nadas"
| Máquina Discos
|-
| 
| Andrés Calamaro
| Pop rock
| "Verdades Afiladas"
| Universal Music Group
|-
| Manual De Viaje A Un Lugar Lejano
| Jumbo
| Pop rock
| 
| Universal Music Group, Discos Valiente
|-
| 'Esto Que Dice!| Carlos Rueda and Diego Daza
| Vallenato
| 
| ONErpm
|-
|8
| Gente| Priscilla Alcântara
| Latin Christian
| 
| Sony Music
|-
|rowspan="6"|9
| Norma| Mon Laferte
| Latin pop
Tropical Fusion
| "El Beso""Por qué me fui a enamorar de ti""El Mambo""Caderas Blancas"
| Universal Music
|-
| Valiente| Thalía
| Latin pop, Reggaeton, trap
| "No me acuerdo""Me Oyen, Me Escuchan""Lento""Lindo Pero Bruto"
| Sony Music Latin
|-
| Agustín| Fonseca
| Latin pop
| 
| Sony Music Latin
|-
| Norma| Mon Laferte
| Latin alternative
| 
| Universal Music Group, Discos Valiente
|-
| Revolucionario| Quinteto Astor Piazzolla
| Tango
| 
| East 54 Entertainment
|-
| Todxs| Ana Cañas
| Brazilian pop
| 
| 
|-
|15
| Raíces| Various artists
| Vallenato
|
| Babel Discos
|-
|rowspan="4"|16
| The Green Trip| Tr3r Elemento
| Regional Mexican
|
| DEL
|-
| Colores| Elida Reyna y Avante
| Tejano
|
| Freddie
|-
| Jazz Batá 2| Chucho Valdés
| Latin jazz
|
| Mack Avenue Music Group
|-
| Astronauta| Zahara
| 
|
| G.O.Z.Z.
|-
|18
| Amor Presente| Leonel García
| 
|
| Sony Music Mexico
|-
|rowspan="5"|23
| Va por México| Luis Cobos with The Royal Philharmonic Orchestra and El
Mariachi Juvenil Tecalitlán
| Folk
|
| Independiente
|-
| Elemental| Jimmy Branly, Jimmy Haslip, and Otmaro Ruiz
| Latin jazz
|
| Blue Canoe
|-
| Rio - São Paulo| André Marques
| Latin jazz
|
| Blaxtream
|-
| Anaí Rosa Atraca Geraldo Pereira| Anaí Rosa
| Samba
|
| Selo Sesc
|-
| Do Avesso| António Zambujo
| Fado
|
| Universal Music Portugal
|-
|rowspan="3"|30
| Una Razón para Seguir| A.N.I.M.A.L.
| Rock en español
|
| Sony Music
|-
| 25 Años Vol. 1| El Mimoso
| Banda
|
| Cielo Music
|-
| O Ouro do Pó da Estrada| Elba Ramalho
| Brazilian roots
|
| Deckdisc
|-
|}

December

Best-selling records
Best-selling albums
The following is a list of the top 10 best-selling Latin albums (including album-equivalent units) in the United States in 2018, according to Billboard.

Best-performing songs
The following is a list of the top 10 best-performing Latin songs in the United States in 2018, according to Billboard''.

Deaths
March 24José Antonio Abreu, 78, Venezuelan conductor and founder of El Sistema and recipient of the Latin Grammy Trustees Award
May 18Anthony Cruz, Puerto Rican-American salsa singer ("Dile a Él" and "No le Temas a Él").
May 28María Dolores Pradera, 93, Spanish singer and actress, recipient of the Latin Grammy Lifetime Achievement Award.
May 28, 64, Venezuelan singer-songwriter (Adrenalina Caribe), shot.
May 31, 98, Dominican merengue singer, recipient of the Latin Grammy Lifetime Achievement Award.
June 6Jimmy Gonzalez, 67, American Tejano singer, fronted Grupo Mazz and a four-time Grammy Award winner.
June 19
Efrén Echeverría, 86, Paraguayan musician, composer, and record collector
June 24 
Ángel Medardo Luzuriaga, 82, Ecuadorian Andean cumbia musician
Xiomara Alfaro, 88, Cuban opera singer
August 7Carlos Almenar Otero, 92, Venezuelan singer and songwriter.
September 7Wilson Moreira, 81, Brazilian singer
September 9Mr. Catra, 49, Brazilian musician (stomach cancer)
September 14Carlos Rubira Infante, 96, Ecuadorian pasillo and pasacalle singer-songwriter
September 18Carmencita Lara, 91, Peruvian singer
September 24
, 80, Argentine folk singer
Vicente Bianchi, 98, Chilean conductor, composer and pianist
September 26Tito Madi, 89, Brazilian singer and composer
September 30Ângela Maria, 89, Brazilian singer
October 1Jerry González, 69, American bandleader and trumpeter (heart attack)
November 13
Lucho Gatica, 90, Chilean bolero singer and actor
Arthur Maia, 56, Brazilian composer and musician (heart attack)
December 16Chiquetete, 70, Spanish flamenco and ballad singer, heart attack ("Esta Cobardía", "Volveré").
December 24Jaime Torres, 80, Argentine charango player.
December 25, 61, Brazilian guitarist and songwriter (Blitz).
December 27Miúcha, 81, Brazilian singer and composer

References

 
Latin music by year